Bill Huntington (11 August 1929 – 18 December 2013) was an Australian rules footballer who played with Carlton in the Victorian Football League (VFL).

Notes

External links 

Bill Huntington's profile at Blueseum

1929 births
Carlton Football Club players
2013 deaths
Australian rules footballers from Victoria (Australia)